This is a list of the Washington Commanders selections in the NFL Draft. The team was founded as the Boston Braves in 1932, named after the local baseball franchise. The team changed their name to the Redskins in 1933 and moved to Washington, D.C. in 1937. The Redskins name was retired in 2020, with the team taking on the temporarily branding of the Washington Football Team before fully rebranding to the Commanders in 2022.

Every year during April, each NFL franchise seeks to add new players to its roster through a collegiate draft known as the "NFL Annual Player Selection Meeting", which is more commonly known as the NFL Draft. Teams are ranked in inverse order based on the previous season's record, with the worst record picking first, and the second worst picking second and so on. The two exceptions to this order are made for teams that appeared in the previous Super Bowl; the Super Bowl champion always picks 32nd, and the Super Bowl loser always picks 31st. Teams have the option of trading away their picks to other teams for different picks, players, cash, or a combination thereof. Thus, it is not uncommon for a team's actual draft pick to differ from their assigned draft pick, or for a team to have extra or no draft picks in any round due to these trades.

The Boston Redskins were one of the nine original franchises that participated in the 1936 NFL Draft, which was the first official draft of the National Football League. The first player ever selected in the draft, Heisman Trophy winner Jay Berwanger, chose not to play professional football. Riley Smith, taken second overall by Washington, is the first drafted player to play in the NFL. The franchise also holds the distinction of being the only team to draft the same player in two different drafts, Cal Rossi.

Positions

Key

1930s

1936 Draft

1937 Draft

1938 Draft

1939 Draft

1940s

1940 Draft

1941 Draft

1942 Draft

1943 Draft

1944 Draft

1945 Draft

1946 Draft

1947 Draft

1948 Draft

1949 Draft

1950s

1950 Draft

1950 AAFC Dispersal Draft
The dispersal draft gave NFL teams the league rights to the players from teams in the dissolved All-America Football Conference.

1951 Draft

1952 Draft

1953 Draft

1954 Draft

1955 Draft

1956 Draft

1957 Draft

1958 Draft

1959 Draft

1960s

1960 Draft

1961 Draft

1962 Draft

1963 Draft

1964 Draft

1965 Draft

1966 Draft

1967 Draft

1968 Draft

1969 Draft

1970s

1970 Draft

1971 Draft

1972 Draft

1973 Draft

1974 Draft

1975 Draft

1976 Draft

1977 Draft

1978 Draft

1979 Draft

1980s

1980 Draft

1981 Draft

1982 Draft

1983 Draft

1984 Draft

1984 Supplemental Draft
The supplemental draft gave NFL teams the league rights to the players who had been eligible to be drafted but were not because they were under contract with teams in the United States Football League or the Canadian Football League.

1985 Draft

1986 Draft

1987 Draft

1988 Draft

1989 Draft

1990s

1990 Draft

1991 Draft

1992 Draft

1993 Draft

1994 Draft

1995 Draft

1996 Draft

1997 Draft

1998 Draft

1999 Draft

2000s

2000 Draft

2001 Draft

2002 Draft

2003 Draft

2004 Draft

2005 Draft

2006 Draft

2007 Draft

2008 Draft

2009 Draft

2009 Supplemental Draft
For their selection in the Supplemental Draft, the Redskins forfeited its sixth round pick in the 2010 NFL Draft.

2010s

2010 Draft

2011 Draft

2012 Draft

2013 Draft

2014 Draft

2015 Draft

2016 Draft

2017 Draft

2018 Draft

2018 Supplemental Draft
For their selection in the Supplemental Draft, the Washington Football Team forfeited its sixth round pick in the 2019 NFL Draft.

2019 Draft

2020s

2020 Draft

2021 Draft

2022 Draft

See also
List of Washington Football Team first-round draft picks
History of the Washington Football Team
List of professional American football drafts

References

External links
 
 
 
 
 
 
 
 
 
 
 
 
 
 

Draft history
National Football League Draft history by team